The voiceless alveolar lateral affricate is a type of consonantal sound, used in some spoken languages. This is also one of the sounds used in the Klingon language.

Features
Features of the voiceless alveolar lateral affricate:

Occurrence

References

Sources

Chen, Qiguang [陈其光]. 2001. "A Brief Introduction of Bana Language [巴那语概况]". Minzu Yuwen.

External links
 
 

Affricates
Alveolar consonants
Lateral consonants
Pulmonic consonants
Voiceless oral consonants